Horizon High School is a public high school in Phoenix, Arizona in the Paradise Valley Unified School District.

The school was established in 1980. The current principal is Shelley Strofus. About 2,400 students are enrolled in the school. The mascot is a Husky.

History 
In 1978 the Paradise Valley Unified School District commissioned the Architecture Firm of Michael and Kemper Goodwin Ltd. to design the new six-building campus. Construction began the following year and was undertaken by the Del E. Webb Corporation and was nearly completed when the school opened in August 1980. The school's Auditorium was constructed in 1983. Additional new classroom buildings were constructed in 2003 and 2008.

Extracurricular activities

Choir 
The Horizon High School Choir has about 400 students in the program. The different choirs include Women’s Choir, Low Frequency, Noteworthy, Show Divas, Towne Criers, Step On Stage, Vocal Ease, and Ensemble.

Athletics 
In May 2019, the men's baseball team won the 5A State Championship. In October 2021, the women’s volleyball team placed second in the Nike Tournament of Champions.

The Horizon football team won the 2021-2022 state championship. The football program has 2 titles 1994, and 2022 with a runner up appearance in 1995.

The Horizon girl’s volleyball team won the 2021 and 2022 5A state championships.

Marching Band 
Under the direction of Kyle Hollerbach, the Horizon Pride Regiment has been a member of the AzMBA since 2016.

The 56th Street Comedy Club 
is also there

Notable alumni (alphabetical order)
 Max Adler, actor.
 Jayson Durocher, former MLB player (Milwaukee Brewers).
 Blair Gavin, former MLS Player for Chivas USA, New England Revolution, and Seattle Sounders FC.
Tuffy Gosewisch, MLB player (Seattle Mariners).
 Garrett Hedlund, actor, model and singer.
 Tommy Joseph, MLB player (Philadelphia Phillies).
 Sydney Leroux, soccer player and member of the United States women's national soccer team.
 Jeff Lewis, football player for Denver Broncos and Carolina Panthers; Northern Arizona University football coach.
 Kellan Lutz, actor.
 Cody McKay, former MLB player (Oakland Athletics, St. Louis Cardinals).
 Grace Park, former professional golfer, six-time LPGA winner.
 Ty Parten, former NFL football player.
 Rob Waldrop, former NFL and CFL football player.
 Jim Walmsley, ultra-marathon runner.
 Brandon Wood, MLB player (Los Angeles Angels, Pittsburgh Pirates).

References

https://www.azcentral.com/story/sports/high-school/2021/12/10/arizona-interscholastic-association-football-championships/6471332001/

External links
 Horizon High School in the Paradise Valley School District

Public high schools in Arizona
Educational institutions established in 1980
Schools in Maricopa County, Arizona
1980 establishments in Arizona